Anthony Dwayne Phillips (born October 5, 1970) is a former American football defensive back in the National Football League who played for the Atlanta Falcons and Minnesota Vikings. He played college football for the Texas A&M–Kingsville Javelinas. He also played in the Arena Football League for the Grand Rapids Rampage and Buffalo Destroyers, winning the Arena Bowl with Grand Rapids in his first season there.

Professional career
After attending Texas A&M–Kingsville, Phillips was drafted by the Atlanta Falcons in 1994. He became a rising star with the Falcons, but in his second season, he suffered a gruesome leg injury. During a game against the Buffalo Bills, Phillips intercepted a pass thrown by Buffalo quarterback Jim Kelly, catching the ball at the Atlanta 2-yard line, and was on his way to returning the ball for a defensive touchdown. However, after 43 yards, Kelly himself caught up to Phillips and tackled him while he was running (in bounds) down the side line, with the latter suffering a compound fracture to both his tibia and fibula on his right leg upon landing awkwardly on it. Phillips was required to stay on his back for a month in order for the bones to heal, and Kelly has since apologized for the injury.

Phillips was cut after one additional season with the Falcons. He later signed with the Minnesota Vikings in 1998, but his season ended with a torn ACL. After the season, he played two seasons in the Arena Football League, helping the Grand Rapids Rampage win ArenaBowl XV, before retiring.

Personal life
Raised in Galveston, Texas, Phillips has two children and later settled in Kalamazoo, Michigan. He was diagnosed with kidney failure, stemming from legal steroid usage during his football career.

References

External links
ESPN stats
Video of Jim Kelly's tackle on Phillips

1970 births
Living people
American football defensive backs
Atlanta Falcons players
Minnesota Vikings players
Grand Rapids Rampage players
Buffalo Destroyers players
Texas A&M–Kingsville Javelinas football players
Sportspeople from Texas